Alexander Nuttall (born August 10, 1985) is a father of two and a Canadian politician who serves as the 47th and current mayor of Barrie. Previously, he served on Barrie City Council from 2006 until 2014, and as the member of Parliament for the federal electoral district of Barrie—Springwater—Oro-Medonte from 2015 to 2019. Nuttall won the 2022 Barrie municipal election and is now serving as Barrie's 47th mayor.

Early life and education 

Nuttall immigrated to Canada with his family in 1989, and grew up living in government-subsidized housing in Barrie, Ontario, with his mother and two older brothers.

He attended Allandale Heights Public School, was elected student mayor while attending St. Peter's Catholic Secondary School in 2002, and went on to graduate from Innisdale Secondary School in 2004. Nuttall majored in Political Science while studying at Redeemer University and Laurentian University.

Community activism

PIE Education 
Nuttall co-founded the PIE Education program in 2010 with Barrie business owners Craig Russell and Angela Pidutti, owners of PIE Wood Fired Pizza Joint, as well as Adam Moulton, owner of Allandale Home Hardware. To-date, the program has provided over 17,500 backpacks filled with school supplies and materials ready for families living in government-subsidized homes and students in need.

Boots and Hearts Barn Burner charity hockey game 
In 2018, Alex Nuttall became host and chair of the Boots and Hearts Barn Burner charity hockey game, formerly known as Hockey Night in Barrie. The Barn Burner brings celebrity hockey players, such as Toronto Maple Leaf Captain, John Tavares, and local community members together to raise money for local charities. On August 3, 2022, the event, held at Sadlon Arena in Barrie, raised $155,000 for the RVH Foundation at Royal Victoria Regional Health Centre, Easter Seals Barrie, and PIE Education.

Lake Simcoe Region Conservation Authority 
Nuttall served as a member of the Executive Board of Directors for the Lake Simcoe Region Conservation Authority from 2006 to 2010. During this time the Authority played a role in establishing the Lake Simcoe Protection Act, 2008.

Political career

Barrie City Council (2006–2014) 

Nuttall served two terms as a city councillor on the Barrie City Council from 2006 until 2014. In 2006, Nuttall received 45.2% of the vote in Ward 10, and in 2010 he was re-elected with 82.7% of the vote.

During his time as a city councillor, Nuttall was employed in the financial services industry.

Provincial politics (2010) 

In 2010, Nuttall sought the Progressive Conservative Party of Ontario nomination for Barrie in order to be the candidate for the 2011 Ontario general election.

On December 8, 2010 Barrie's PC riding association nominating committee requested that he step down as a candidate. The campaign was briefly put on hold pending an internal investigation by the Ontario PC Party to determine the validity of concerns regarding member recruitment methods. Nuttall's campaign was cleared to continue for the nomination meeting. The then-president of the Barrie riding association, Fred Hamelin, resigned from his role citing "personal ethics".

Nuttall lost the nomination to Rod Jackson who went on to win the riding in the general election.

Federal politics (2015–2019) 

Nuttall served as a Member of Parliament in the House of Commons, representing Barrie—Springwater—Oro-Medonte from 2014 to 2019.

Following the 2015 Federal Election, Nuttall was appointed as the Official Opposition Critic for Economic Development for Southern Ontario on November 20, 2015. On April 8, 2016, Nuttall also accepted the role of Official Opposition Critic Deputy Critic for Innovation, Science and Economic Development, as well as Official Opposition Critic for the New Sharing Economy. On August 30, 2017, Nuttall was named Official Opposition Critic for Youth, Sports, and Persons with Disabilities.

During the first half of the 42nd Parliament, Nuttall served on the Standing Committee on Industry, Science and Technology. Beginning in Fall 2017, he became a member of the Standing Committee on Human Resources, Skills and Social Development and the Status of Persons with Disabilities.

Nuttall did not run for re-election in the 2019 federal election.

Reaction to Canada-wide opioid crisis 
In 2018, MP Alex Nuttall called for a debate in the House of Commons to discuss the opioid emergency in Barrie, ON. Nuttall publicly supported the possibility of a declared public health emergency in Barrie to prevent further deaths due to the opioid crisis. On November 26, 2018, Nuttall released a 49-page report opposing Canada's plan to address the opioid crisis. The report outlined his strategy to combat the crisis by focusing on prevention alternatives.

Municipal Election 2022 
In May 2022, Nuttall announced he was running for mayor of Barrie in the 2022 Barrie municipal election. Nuttall won the election against six other candidates, including Barrie Deputy Mayor Barry Ward and City Councillor Mike McCann. He officially became the 47th Mayor of Barrie on November 15, 2022. Prior to the election he was the Vice President of sales, marketing and customer service for the telecommunications company, North Frontenac Telephone Company (NFTC).

Mayor of Barrie 
As of November 15, 2022, Nuttall is serving as the 47th Mayor of Barrie. On November 21, 2022, Mayor Nuttall announced that Barrie Ward 5 councillor Robert Thomson was his choice to serve as the next Deputy Mayor of Barrie.

Electoral history

Federal

References

External links

1985 births
Living people
Conservative Party of Canada MPs
Members of the House of Commons of Canada from Ontario
Mayors of Barrie
Laurentian University alumni
English emigrants to Canada
Politicians from Liverpool
21st-century Canadian politicians